Judith Arndt (born 23 July 1976) is a retired German professional cyclist, who last rode for the GreenEDGE-AIS cycling team. She won the bronze medal in the 3000 m pursuit event at the 1996 Summer Olympics when she was 20. In 2004, she won the world road race championship and came second in the Olympic road race.

Career
Arndt won the national individual pursuit championship four times and Olympic bronze in the same competition. But a viral infection during the 2000 Summer Olympics – causing a disappointing outcome  – marked the turning in her career. In two years, she finished third in the Grande Boucle (sometimes referred to as the "women's Tour de France)" in 2003, won the Tour de l'Aude twice (2002 and 2003), and added a silver medal in the road time trial at the 2003 world championship in Hamilton, Ontario.

At the 2004 Summer Olympics in Athens, Greece she won silver in the road race, and, two weeks later, became world road champion at Verona, Italy. She finished first in the UCI world ranking.

In 2005, she won the national road championship for the sixth time.

Arndt was appointed as a member of the inaugural UCI Athletes' Commission in 2011.

At the 2012 Summer Olympics in London, Great Britain she competed in the Women's road race and won silver in the time trial. She also competed on the track in the Women's team pursuit for the national team. Arndt ended her career after taking gold in the time trial event of the 2012 World Championships.

Palmarès

1995
1st Overall Drei Tagen von Pattenson
1 stage win
2nd German time trial championship
2nd Overall Grazia Tour
3rd GP Krasna Lipa

1996
1st  National Individual Pursuit Championship
2nd National road championship
2nd Tour du Finistère
3rd Olympic Games Individual Pursuit

1997
1st  World Individual Pursuit Championship
1st  National Individual Pursuit Championship
3rd National Road Race Championship
3rd World Time Trial Championship

1998
National Road Championship
1st  Time Trial
2nd Road Race Championship
1st  National Individual Pursuit Championship
1st Overall GP Mutualité de Haute Garonne
1 Stage win
8th World Time Trial Championship

1999
National Road Championship
1st  Time Trial
1st  Road Race
1st  National Individual Pursuit Championship
1st Tour de Bretagne
2nd Overall Holland Ladies' Tour
1 stage win
6th World Time Trial Championship

2000
1st  National Individual Pursuit Championship
4th Olympic Games Points race
6th Olympic Games Individual pursuit,
7th Olympic Games Time Trial Championship
9th World Time Trial Championship
10th Overall Women's Challenge
10th Overall Gracia–Orlová

2001
1st  National Time Trial Championship
1st  Overall Gracia–Orlová
2 stage wins
1st  Overall GP Féminin de Bretagne
1 stage win
1st Rotterdam Tour
2nd UCI Road World Cup
2nd Overall Women's Challenge
1 stage win
2nd Overall Tour de l'Aude Cycliste Féminin
1 stage win
2nd Overall Thüringen-Rundfahrt
3rd Overall Grande Boucle Féminine
4th UCI World Championship Road Race
5th UCI World Championship Time Trial
5th Overall Vuelta Internacional a Mallorca
1 stage win

2002
1st  National Road Race Championship
1st  Overall Women's Challenge
2 stage wins
1st  Overall Tour de l'Aude Cycliste Féminin
1 stage win
1st Overall Tour de Snowy
1st Overall Solano Bicycle Classic
1st Overall Redlands Bicycle Classic
2 stage wins
1 stage win Grande Boucle Féminin
2nd Overall Vuelta a Castilla y León
1 stage win
4th Overall Thüringen-Rundfahrt der Frauen
5th Overall UCI road World Cup
5th Montréal
9th World Time Trial Championship

2003
1st  Overall Tour de l'Aude Cycliste Féminin
1st  Overall GP Feminin du Canada
1 stage win
UCI Road World Championships
2nd Time Trial
8th Road Race
2nd GP de Plouay
2nd Overall Gracia–Orlová
2 stage wins
3rd Overall Grande Boucle
3 stage wins
3rd Overall UCI Road World Cup
3rd Montreal World Cup
3rd Sydney World Cup
4th Overall Thüringen-Rundfahrt der Frauen
5th Damesronde van Drenthe
5th Overall Vuelta a Castilla y León

2004
1st  Overall UCI Road World Cup
UCI Road World Championships
1st  Road race
2nd Time trial
1st  Overall Tour du Grand Montréal
1 stage win
2nd Olympic Games Road Race Championship
2nd Coupe du Monde Cycliste Féminine de Montréal
2nd Overall Tour de l'Aude Cycliste Féminin 
2nd Overall Thüringen-Rundfahrt der Frauen
5th Overall Giro della Toscana 
5th La Flèche Wallonne Féminine

2005
1st  National Time Trial Championship
1st  Overall Gracia–Orlová
2 stage wins
1st  Overall Vuelta a Castilla y León
1 stage win
1st GP of Wales World Cup
2nd GP Feminas Castilla y León
3rd Overall UCI Road World Cup
3rd Overall Giro del Trentino
3rd Overall Thüringen-Rundfahrt der Frauen
3rd Overall Damesronde van Drenthe
3rd Overall Geelong Tour
3rd La Flèche Wallonne Féminine
4th World Time Trial Championship

2006
1st Coupe du Monde Cycliste Féminine de Montréal
2nd Geelong World Cup
2nd La Flèche Wallonne Féminine
2nd GP Feminas Castilla y León
3rd Overall Holland Ladies Tour
4th Overall UCI Road World Cup

2007
1st  Overall Gracia–Orlová
2 stage wins
1st  Overall Thüringen-Rundfahrt der Frauen
1st Stage 3 (ITT) Tour du Grand Montréal
1st Stage 6 Giro d'Italia Femminile
2nd Overall Holland Ladies Tour
1 stage win
3rd Overall Tour de l'Aude Cycliste Féminin
3rd La Flèche Wallonne Féminine

2008
1st  Overall Thüringen-Rundfahrt
1st Coupe du Monde Cycliste Féminine de Montréal
2nd Overall 2008 Tour de l'Aude Cycliste Féminin
3rd La Flèche Wallonne Féminine
5th Overall Holland Ladies Tour

2009
1st Overall Iurreta-Emakumeen Bira
1st Stages 1, 3 & 5 
1st Stage 7 Giro d'Italia Internazionale Femminile
2nd Durango-Durango Emakumeen Saria
UCI Road World Championships
4th Road Race
6th Time Trial
5th Overall Giro del Trentino Alto Adige-Südtirol
7th Overall Giro della Toscana Int. Femminile
9th Overall Tour du Grand Montréal

 2010
1st  Overall Giro della Toscana Int. Femminile
2nd Overall Giro d'Italia Internazionale Femminile
2nd Overall La Route de France
1st Stage 6
2nd Overall Giro del Trentino Alto Adige-Südtirol
UCI Road World Championships
2nd Time Trial
5th Road Race
2nd GP Ciudad de Valladolid
2nd Grand Prix de Suisse
2nd Coupe des nations Ville Saguenay
2nd Open de Suède Vårgårda TTT
3rd Overall Iurreta-Emakumeen Bira
1st Stage 1 
3rd Australian Open Road Championships
4th Durango-Durango Emakumeen Saria
4th GP Plouay
8th Ronde van Vlaanderen
8th Trofeo Alfredo Binda-Comune di Cittiglio
9th La Flèche Wallonne Féminine

2011
1st  Individual World Time Trial Championship
1st  Overall Women's Tour of New Zealand
1st Stages 1 & 2
1st  Overall Giro del Trentino Alto Adige-Südtirol
1st Stage 2
National Road Championships
1st  Time Trial
2nd Road Race
1st Open de Suède Vårgårda TTT
1st Memorial Davide Fardelli – Cronometro Individuale
1st Chrono Champenois – Trophée Européen
1st Stage 6 Internationale Thüringen Rundfahrt der Frauen
1st Stages 1, 3 & 5 Premondiale Giro Toscana Int. Femminile
2nd Grand Prix Elsy Jacobs
2nd Grand-prix Nicolas Frantz
3rd Overall Giro d'Italia Femminile
3rd Overall Iurreta-Emakumeen Bira
3rd Durango-Durango Emakumeen Saria
3rd La Flèche Wallonne Féminine
4th Australian Open Road Championships
4th GP Ciudad de Valladolid
5th Tour of Flanders
7th Trofeo Alfredo Binda-Comune di Cittiglio
7th GP de Plouay
9th Open de Suède Vårgårda

2012
UCI Road World Championships
1st  Time Trial
2nd Team Time Trial
8th Road Race
National Road Championships
1st  Time Trial
1st  Road Race
1st  Overall Ladies Tour of Qatar
1st  Overall Thüringen-Rundfahrt der Frauen
1st  Overall Emakumeen Euskal Bira
1st Tour of Flanders
2nd Open de Suède Vårgårda TTT
3rd Overall Brainwash Ladies Tour
3rd Durango-Durango Emakumeen Saria
4th Trofeo Alfredo Binda-Comune di Cittiglio
6th Overall Giro d'Italia Internazionale Femminile
6th La Flèche Wallonne Féminine
9th Overall Women's Tour of New Zealand
1st Stage 3
10th Overall Energiewacht Tour
10th Overall GP Elsy Jacobs
10th Classica Citta di Padova
10th GP de Plouay

Results timelines

Private life
Arndt has lived in Leipzig since 1996, with her partner, fellow cyclist Petra Rossner. The couple became Gay Games ambassadors in 2005. In 2012, after the World Cup, she was in a relationship with Australian lawyer, and former cyclist Anna Wilson, and moved to Melbourne.

References

External links

 
 
 
 
 
 

1976 births
Living people
People from Königs Wusterhausen
People from Bezirk Potsdam
German track cyclists
German female cyclists
Cyclists from Brandenburg
LGBT cyclists
German LGBT sportspeople
Olympic cyclists of Germany
Cyclists at the 1996 Summer Olympics
Cyclists at the 2000 Summer Olympics
Cyclists at the 2004 Summer Olympics
Cyclists at the 2008 Summer Olympics
Cyclists at the 2012 Summer Olympics
Olympic silver medalists for Germany
Olympic bronze medalists for Germany
Olympic medalists in cycling
UCI Road World Champions (women)
Medalists at the 2012 Summer Olympics
UCI Track Cycling World Champions (women)
Medalists at the 2004 Summer Olympics
Medalists at the 1996 Summer Olympics
20th-century German women
21st-century German women